The spotted pike-conger (Hoplunnis tenuis), also known as the conger eel in Cuba, is an eel in the family Nettastomatidae (duckbill/witch eels). It was described by Isaac Ginsburg in 1951. It is a marine, deep water-dwelling eel which is known from the western Atlantic Ocean, including the Gulf of Mexico and the Straits of Florida, USA.

References

Nettastomatidae
Fish described in 1951